The Hungary women's youth national handball team is the national under–17 Handball team of the Hungary. Controlled by the Hungarian Handball Federation it represents the country in international matches.

History

IHF U-18 World Championship 
 Champions   Runners up   Third place   Fourth place

European U-17 Championship 
 Champions   Runners up   Third place   Fourth place

*Red border color indicates tournament was held on home soil.

Other tournaments 
European Youth Olympic Festival
: 2017, 2022
: 2019
European Open Handball Championship
: 2018
: 2008

See also
 Hungary women's national handball team
 Hungary women's national junior handball team

References

External links
Official website

Handball in Hungary
Women's national youth handball teams
Handball